Cockburn Island is the name of the following islands:
Cockburn Island (Antarctica)
Cockburn Island (Ontario)
Cockburn Island (Polynesia), the former name of Fangataufa in French Polynesia

In addition, the Cockburn Islands are a group of islands in the Canadian Arctic.